Mackenzie Willis (born 7 August 1995) is a former Australian rules footballer playing for the Gold Coast Football Club in the Australian Football League (AFL). He was drafted by the Gold Coast Football Club with their fourth selection and fifty-second overall in the 2015 national draft. He made his debut in the 120 point loss against  in round 6, 2016 at Simonds Stadium. He was delisted by Gold Coast at the conclusion of the 2018 season.

References

External links

1995 births
Living people
Gold Coast Football Club players
Australian rules footballers from Tasmania
Kingborough Football Club players
Hobart Football Club players
Southport Australian Football Club players